The Finger of Fate is an aid rock climbing route located in Moab, Utah, on the Titan, the tallest of the Fisher Towers. It was first climbed in 1962. The route saw its first clean ascent in 1996 by Stevie Haston and Laurence Gauoult.  The route is recognized in the historic climbing text Fifty Classic Climbs of North America and considered a classic around the world.

References

External links 
"Finger of Fate" at RockClimbing.com
"Fisher Towers" at Mountain Project
"Finger of Fate, Fisher Towers, The Titan 5.8 C3F" at SuperTopo

Climbing routes